Yamasa Dam is a gravity dam located in Shimane Prefecture in Japan. The dam is used for flood control and water supply. The catchment area of the dam is 19.2 km2. The dam impounds about 28  ha of land when full and can store 5050 thousand cubic meters of water. The construction of the dam was started on 1970 and completed in 1980.

References

Dams in Shimane Prefecture
1980 establishments in Japan